Peter Jensen (born in Løgstør, Denmark) is a clothing  designer.

Background 
Jensen initially studied graphic design, embroidery and tailoring at The Royal Danish Academy of Design in Copenhagen before moving to London in 1997 to undertake an MA in menswear at Central Saint Martins College of Art and Design. He graduated in 1999 and formed his eponymous menswear label afterwards, subsequently also introducing womenswear. Jensen has regularly shown his collections on the main schedule at London Fashion Week, Copenhagen Fashion Week and New York fashion week.

Jensen and his design team worked in a studio based in Dalston, East London until 2018. The designer moved to Atlanta, USA in 2018 to start as chair of fashion at Savannah college of art and design.
Jensen started a new brand <<Yours Truly>> in 2020. It is a sustainable clothing brand made and produced in Denmark and in England.
<<Yours Truly>> is also a platform to promote emerging artists, no matter their age or choice of material.
The new brand opens up in September 2022. The brand includes A gingham line, A homeline, A smock-line and A line with other artists.

Artistic work method 
His muses have included Hollywood actress Mary Miles Minter, American photographer Tina Barney, the character Candice Marie from the Mike Leigh film, Nuts In May, Carrie-era Sissy Spacek, Olympic ice skater Tonya Harding, John Waters' actress Mink Stole, the legendary Helena Rubinstein, collector and more Gertrude Stein, artist Cindy Sherman, singer Nina Simone and even Jensen's own Auntie Jytte, who ran a chip shop and taxi company in Nuuk, Greenland, Art collector Peggy Guggenheim and Actress Shelly Duvall amongst others.

Critics' comments 
Jensen has consistently received considerable industry support from many of the most respected international fashion critics, editors and writers:

Harriet Quick, British Vogue: Cleverly conceived, quirkily humorous clothes.... both distinctive and of the moment. (www.vogue.co.uk)

Sarah Mower, Vogue runway: The light-hearted Peter Jensen experience has become a moment to cherish. Jensen’s clothes never seem to be overly styled, but ... capture the gist of things without seeming to try. (www.style.com)

Women's Wear Daily: A breath of fresh air... Jensen offers the cool basics that every girl should have in her wardrobe. (www.wwd.com)

James Anderson, ponystep.com In the case of his womenswear, specifically, the stylistic inspiration he has routinely drawn from infamous female spirits such as actress Sissy Spacek, artist Cindy Sherman or disgraced Olympic ice skater Tanya Harding, for example, have always ensured that both the reference points and overall results are appealingly left-of-centre yet always wearable. (www.ponystep.com)

Tim Blanks, BOF: The challenge of how best to show their clothes is inspiring more and more designers to spectacularly creative flights of fancy. Peter Jensen's collaboration with the American artist Laurie Simmons produced one of the most enjoyably bizarre—and bizarrely complex—presentations to date.

i-D: Creatively and technically brilliant... visually and conceptually captivating. (www.i-dmagazine.co.uk)

Susannah Frankel, Another Magazine: Witty, pretty, proudly individual and imaginative in the extreme. (www.independent.co.uk)

Fans 
Famous fans of Jensen's designs include pop stars Amy Winehouse, Rihanna, Nina Persson from The Cardigans, Kanye West and The Zutons’ Abi Harding. High-profile actresses among his customer base include Rachel Bilson, Orlando Bloom, Kirsten Dunst, Lena Dunham, Dakota Fanning, Sofie Gråbøl, Maggie Gyllenhaal, Nicole Kidman and Lindsay Lohan. Film maker John Waters has also expressed his admiration for Jensen's work and various designs from the SS/08 Mink collection - inspired by Waters' celluloid stalwart Mink Stole - now form part of the John Waters Archive at Wesleyan University, Connecticut, USA.

Collaborations 
'Oh Dear A typology of drainpipes' Pictures by Dante Fewster Holdsworth, Short story by Peter Jensen
Julie & Peter - A fur wall. An art exhibition with Julie Verhoeven
Annie & Peter - A road trip. An art exhibition, Supported by Danish Arts Foundation, Denmark
Road trip exhibition hold in Copenhagen, London and Los Angeles
Pyjamas capsule collection for Juna Rosendahl Design Group, Copenhagen
Donated Peter Jensen archive work from 2001–2018 to the following:
V&A in London
Design Museum Denmark in Copenhagen
Manchester Art Gallery in Manchester
Central Saint Martins in London
The John Waters archive in Baltimore
Fashion Museum, Bath, England
National Museum of Denmark, Copenhagen
Greenland National Museum Nuuk, Greenland.
Westminster college, London.
London College of Fashion, England
Berlin University of the Arts Berlin, Germany
Fashion Institute of Technology in New York
Fifth brand store opens in South Korea
Peter Jensen Pastel World stores open in South Korea -
Peter Jensen for People Tree SS19 Collection
“Jeanette” Book published by Dent-de-Leone
“Jytte” Boots added to permanent collection of National Museum of Denmark
Peter Jensen capsule collection for Nickelodeon
Peter Jensen for People Tree SS18 and AW18 collection
15 year Anniversary Party - Copenhagen supported by Danish Arts Foundation
15 year Anniversary party L.A. - Virgil Normal
Peter Jensen for Hazzys (Korea) collection
Peter Jensen for People Tree AW17 collection
Second range for LeSportsac AW.
Peter Jensen x Fashionary
Designed a range for LeSportsac SS.
Designed t-shirt for Expo Milan
AW09 ”Jytte” Boots featured in the V&A Shoes:Pleasure and pain
Special items for Le Bon Marche, Paris
Pop up shop Le Bon Marche, Paris
Peter Jensen for People Tree SS19 Collection
Colette window with Peanuts SS15
Items from SS14 featured on TV-Series ”Portlandia”
Special collection for Colette, Paris
Dress for Lena Dunham for the Emmys
Special range for Beams Tokyo
Solo exhibition at the Hepworth Wakefield, England
Special T-shirt for Opening Ceremony (brand) Tokyo
On the committee at the Design Museum London
Winner of the Magasin du Nord design award in Denmark
Costumes for Lena Dunham for her HBO series ”Girls”
Boots and dress from the AW09/10 collection featured in Laurie Simmons book ”Love Doll”
Fred Perry 60 year anniversary - Designed customised polo shirt
10 year anniversary exhibition at Seoul National University Museum of Art, Korea
Peter Jensen for Urban Outfitters US - PJ by Peter Jensen for Urban
Fashion in Motion at V&A - Retrospective fashion show
10 year anniversary exhibition at Diptrics, Tokyo
10 year anniversary exhibition at Design Museum Denmark
10 year anniversary book published by Dent-de-Leone
Costumes for Lena Dunham for her feature film Tiny Furniture
Peter Jensen for Urban Outfitters US - PJ by Peter Jensen for Urban
Peter Jensen for Dover Street Market 2011
Peter Jensen for Weekday - Capsule collection menswear and womenswear
Peter Jensen for Dover Street Market 2010
Tim Walker and Peter Jensen for Dover Street Market 2009
Peter Jensen for Dover Street Market 2008
Peter Jensen for Topshop - Capsule collection for Topshop Boutique womenswear
Peter Jensen for Fred Perry - Capsule collection. Collection won Wallpaper (magazine) award for best collaboration 
Peter Jensen for Topshop - Capsule collection for Topshop Boutique, womenswear 2009
Peter Jensen for Topshop - Capsule collection for Topshop Boutique, womenswear 2008
Peter Jensen for Topshop - Capsule collection for Topshop Boutique, womenswear 2007
Peter Jensen for Fred Perry - Capsule collection, menswear and womenswear
Peter Jensen for Topshop - Capsule collection for Topshop Boutique, womenswear 2006
Peter Jensen for Ebonyivory boutiques, Japan - Capsule collection, womenswear 2006
Peter Jensen for topshop - Capsule collection for Topshop Boutique, womenswear 2005

Distinctions 
Since 2001 head of Menswear, MA Fashion at Central Saint Martins College of Art and Design, London, since 2005 judge, BA Fashion Design Awards, same place. Since 2006 associate lecturer, BA, Fashion Menswear at Ravensbourne College of Design and Communication, London, and since 2005 member of Faculty of Design Industry Advisory Committee same place. Censor for Degree students at Designskolen Kolding, Denmark (2007) and TEKO Design and Business School, Herning, Denmark (2008 and 2010). Received the three-year Work Grant form the Danish Arts Council (2009) and honoured with the award Sølvsmed Kay Bojesen og hustru Erna Bojesens Mindelegat (2011) and the Magasin du Nords Fond (2012), Danish Arts Council for art project 'the party', Danish Arts Council 2018 for 'Annie & Peter- A road trip, from Copenhagen to Løgstør, Danish Arts Council 2020 for 'Dante, Maki and Peter-A road trip in America', Danish Arts Council 2020 for 'Yours Truly', 2021 honoured by Danish arts council the lifetime award

Special projects 
To mark the 10-year anniversary of Peter Jensen Ltd, Dent-de-Leone Publishers released a comprehensive book 2011 edited by Åbäke, Jensen and Gerard Wilson, with essays by Susannah Frankel and Emily King. Further, Jensen has participated in various exhibitions and these ought to be mentioned: 27 March 2013, fashion show and exhibition at the Hepworth Wakefield Museum (with hats designed by Bernstock Speirs). Outfits from the 2005-collection 'Fanny' and the 2009-collection 'Jytte' were 2013 included in the permanent exhibition at the Victoria & Albert Museum (London). Exhibition at the House of Voltaire London 21 November to 15 December 2012 (together with among others Jeremy Deller, Wolfgang Tillmans). Solo presentation at the Victoria & Albert Museum London as part of the programme Fashion in Motion 18 November 2011. Group exhibition Reconstruction: Cultural Heritage and the Making of Contemporary Fashion (with among others Vivienne Westwood and Hussein Chalayan) arranged by  The British Council and touring in Kazakhstan, Russia, Uzbekistan and Bangladesh (2011). Solo exhibition at the Designmuseum Denmark 5 August 2011 to 30 October 2011, the title of the exhibition: Peter Jensen's Muses. Online project 9 September 2010 to 30 October 2010, In Wolves Clothing Re-imagining the Doll together with visual artist Laurie Simmons.'The party' a one night exhibition in Copenhagen with performance by Nina Persson and Nathan Larson performing the soundtrack from the AW10/11 collection, this time in German, 2018 'Annie & Peter-A road trip, from Copenhagen to Løgstør' which was a solo exhibition in Copenhagen October/November 2018 with photographer Annie Collinge, 2020 published book with photographer Dante Fewster Holdsworth 'Oh Dear -A typology of drainpipes' Short story by Jensen.

Jensen's collections are consistently inspired by and named after a Muse. They are:

AW 01-02 'Minter' - Mary Miles Minter was an American silent film actress. She died in 1984.

SS 2002	'Mildred' - is the character that Bette Davis played in the 1934 American film Of Human Bondage.

AW 02-03 'Emma' - is the English fashion designer Emma Cook.

SS 2003	'Olga' - Olga Korbut was a Russian gymnast, famous for her 1972 OL-performance.

AW 03-04 'Nancy' - Nancy Mitford was an English author, famous for her book The Pursuit of Love and being the eldest of the Mitford sisters.

SS 2004	'Gertrude' - Gertrude Stein, a rich and influential American art collector who lived in Paris, died in 1946.

AW 04-05 'Cindy' - American artist Cindy Sherman.		

SS 2005	'Tonya'	- Tonya Harding, the American ice-skater, famous for an attack on rival ice skater Nancy Kerrigan in 1994.

AW 05-06 'Fanny' - A fictional character from the Ingmar Bergman film Fanny och Alexander.

SS 2006	'Sissy'	- Sissy Spacek is an American actress, famous for her roles in the films Badlands (1973), Carrie (1976) and Coal Miner's Daughter (1980).

AW 06-07 'Helena' - Helena Rubinstein died in 1965 as one of the richest women in the world due to her beauty product.

SS 2007	'Tina' - Tina Barney is an American photographer, mostly photographing her own family.

AW 07-08 'Christina' - Princess Christina of Denmark was the 3rd child of King Christian the 2nd of Denmark. She died in 1590.

SS 2008	'Mink' - Mink Stole has been part of all the John Waters films since 1969.

AW 08-09 'Candice-Marie' - Candice-Marie is the character in the Mike Leigh film Nuts in May played by the actress Alison Steadman.		

AW 08-09 'Keith'- Keith is the character in the Mike Leigh film Nuts in May played by the actor Roger Sloman.

SS 2009	'Jodie'	- Jodie Foster is an American actress.

AW 09-10 'Jytte' - Jytte is Peter Jensen's aunt, who lived for years in Greenland.

Resort 2010 'Diana' - Diana Arbus was an American photographer.

SS 2010	'Laurie' - Laurie Simmons is an American artist and photographer.

AW 10-11 'Muriel' - Dame Muriel Spark is a Scottish novelist, most famous for her novel The Prime of Miss Jean Brodie.

Resort 2011 'Abigail' - Based on Mike Leigh's film Abigail's Party.

SS 2011	'Shelley' - Shelley Duvall is an American actress, the star of the Stanley Kubrick film The Shining.

AW 11-12 'Anna-Karina'	- Anna Karina (Hanne Karin Blarke Bayer) born in Denmark, but found fame as a French actress in Jean-Luc Godard films.

Resort 2012 'Meryl' - Meryl Streep is an American actress.		

SS 2012	'Bush' - Thomas Bush is an English graphic designer.

SS 2012	'Nina'	- Nina Simone was an American singer, songwriter, pianist, arranger, and civil rights activist. She died in 2003.

Prefall 2012 'Erika' - Erika Wall is a Swedish model.

AW 12-13 'Thelma' - Thelma Speirs has been part of the London club scene since the 1980s, she is also one half of the hat company Bernstock-Speirs.

Resort 2013 'Tippi' - Tippi Hedren is famous for playing the lead in the Alfred Hitchcock films The Birds and Marnie.

SS 2013	'Mick' - Mick Jagger is an English singer, member of the Rolling Stones.

SS 2013	'Barbara' - Barbara Hepworth was an English sculptor.

Pre-AW 13-24 'Arne' - Arne Jacobsen was a world-famous Danish architect.

AW 13-14 'Viv' - Vivian Nicholson said "Spend, spend, spend" in 1961 when she won the pools in England.

Resort 2014 'Paulette' - Paulette Goddard was an American actress in the 1930s and became a very rich lady. She would later hang out in the Factory with Andy Warhol.		

SS 2014	'Andy' - Andy Warhol was an American pop artist, famous for a lot of things but mostly his silk prints.

SS 2014	'Diana'	- Diana Ross is an American singer.

Pre-fall 14 'Sunny' - Sunny von Bülow, most famous today for having been in a coma for 28 years. She was an American heiress. Glenn Close played her in the film Reversal of Fortune.

AW 2014 'Claus' - Claus von Bülow. Married to Sunny von Bülow. Born and bread in Denmark. Famous for being first found guilty and then cleared for having tried to killed Sunny von Bülow.

Resort 15 'Yoko' - Yoko Ono is a famous visual Fluxus artist. Married to John Lennon. Still working today.

SS 2015 'Lucy' - Lucy is the lead girl in Peanuts. Drawn by Charles Schulz in 1952.

Pre-fall 15 'Penelope' - Penelope Tree became famous for wearing a very sexy Betsey Johnson-dress to the Thurman Carpote Black and White Ball in 1966.

AW 2015 'Julia' - Princess Julia became famous in the late 1970s and through the 1980s for her part in the London club-scene.

Resort 16 'Enid' - Enid is the main character in the comic book Ghostworld, which was made into a cult film in 2001 starring Thora Birch and Scarlett Johansson.

SS 2016 'Shirley' - Shirley Kurata is a LA based stylist whom Peter Jensen has worked with for years and years. She has also done a Prada film with Autumn de Wilde.

AW 16-17 'Peggy' - Peggy Guggenheim was an American heiress who spend all her money on art and lovers.

Resort 2017 'Rhoda'- Part 1 Womenswear collection. Rhoda Vava Mary Lecky Birley was keen gardener who feed her roses lobsters.

SS 2017 'Rhoda' Part 2 Womenswear collection.

AW 17-18 'Greatest hits' Womenswear collection. Items from over the last 10 years, including drawings of all the past muses by English artist Julie Verhoeven.

Resort 2018 'Sandy' Part 1. Womenswear collection. Sandy Dennis was an American Theater and film actress. She won an Oscar for her performance in Who's Afraid of Virginia Woolf?.

SS 2018 'Sandy' Part 2. Womenswear collection.

AW 18-19 'Kajsa' Womenswear collection. The final collection. The muse was Swedish graphic designer Kajsa Stahl, partner of graphic group Abake.

Fall 2022 'Yours Truly' opened www.yourstrulybypeterjensen.com

References 
 https://www.instagram.com/peter_jensen_official/
 http://www.peterjensen.co.uk - official website.
 https://www.vogue.com/fashion-shows/designer/peter-jensen
 https://www.youtube.com/watch?v=COCnGSxe8kc
 http://trendland.com/peter-jensen-springsummer-14-resort-14/ review on the collections inspired by Paulette Goddard and Andy Warhol, June 2013.
 https://www.theguardian.com/fashion/sharpened-lead/2013/jun/11/peter-jensens-arne-jacobsen-menswear fashion inspired by Arne Jacobsen furniture, June 2013.
 http://channel.louisiana.dk/video/peter-jensen-lonely-side-glamorous-life Peter Jensen: The other side of Andy Warhol. Video interview by Louisiana Channel, Denmark, 2013.
 https://www.youtube.com/watch?v=YFfyKey-c2o Crane.tv film about Peter Jensen and Barbara Hepworth (2:41 minutes), November 2012.
 The Independent
 https://www.youtube.com/watch?v=oJQhwy356hI - interview (5:53 min.) Peter Jensen, Designmuseum Denmark, August 2011
 https://www.youtube.com/watch?v=tvMVTfhIZpM&feature=player_embedded - Peter Jensen F/W 2010 presentation at Milk Studios during New York Fashion Week with singer Nina Persson from The Cardigans.
 https://www.youtube.com/watch?v=ky2Pi_5o-Dk - Peter Jensen 'Screentest', film by Colin O'Toole, 2009.
 http://www.vogue.co.uk/fashion/show.aspx/expert-interview-video/id,5612
 http://www.ponystep.com/fashion/article/SEVENTYSEVENPETERJENSENISMS_346.aspx
 http://www.style.com/fashionshows/review/S2010RTW-PJENSEN/
 The Independent
 http://www.guardian.co.uk/lifeandstyle/2009/mar/26/fashion-peter-jensen-death-threats
 https://www.youtube.com/watch?v=UdLI9qEzqHU&feature=player_embedded - Peter Jensen show Tonya SS05 with professional ice skaters, London 2005.
 https://www.disneyrollergirl.net/london-fashion-week-ss10-peter-jensen/
 https://www.papermag.com/peter-jensen-shirley-kurata-fashion-1642270181.html
 https://www.interviewmagazine.com/fashion/peter-jensen-barbara-hepworth
 http://www.lauriesimmons.net/projects/peter-jensen-laurie-collaboration
 https://kunsten.nu/journal/muserne-er-paa-spil/
 https://www.euroman.dk/mode/peter-jensen-laver-nyt-maerke-og-flytter-hjem-til-danmark-efter-25-aar-i-udlandet
 https://nordjyske.dk/nyheder/vesthimmerland/peter-er-verdensberoemt-og-nu-faar-han-stoette-resten-af-livet-jeg-er-bare-saa-glad-og-beaeret/5f8f30c1-1f7e-46b7-982c-34f7e30680be
 https://www.kunst.dk/om-os/haedersydelser-og-praemieringer/modtagere/peter-jensen

Danish fashion designers
1969 births
Living people
People from Vesthimmerland Municipality